Eneko Bóveda Altube (born 14 December 1988) is a Spanish professional footballer who plays as a right-back or central defender.

He started his career at Athletic Bilbao, returning there after a four-year spell with Eibar.

Club career

Athletic Bilbao
Born in Bilbao, Biscay, Bóveda was a product of Athletic Bilbao's famed youth academy at Lezama. He made his debut as a senior with the farm team in the 2006–07 season, in the Tercera División, and was promoted to the reserves who competed in the Segunda División B in summer 2008.

Bóveda made his first-team – and La Liga – debut on 26 April 2009 in a 2–1 home win against Racing de Santander, coming on as a 70th-minute substitute for David López. He spent the vast majority of his spell registered with the B side, however.

Eibar
On 1 July 2011, Bóveda signed for neighbouring SD Eibar also in the third tier. He was an undisputed first-choice in the 2012–13 campaign, as the Armeros returned to Segunda División after a four-year absence.

Bóveda scored his first professional goal on 13 April 2014, but in a 1–2 home loss to CD Tenerife. He appeared in 18 matches during the season, achieving promotion to the top flight (the club's first ever).

Bóveda scored his first goal in the Spanish top division on 25 October 2014, closing the 1–1 home draw against Granada CF.

Return to Athletic
Bóveda returned to Athletic on 1 July 2015, after refusing to renew his contract. The following month, he featured in both legs of the Supercopa de España in which his team defeated FC Barcelona. He started infrequently in his first and second seasons but was a useful squad member, providing cover both at full-back and in the centre of the defence.

On 17 January 2018, still only appearing occasionally and with his contract running out at the end of the campaign, it was announced that Bóveda would not receive an extension.

Deportivo
On 22 January 2018, Bóveda signed for fellow top-tier club Deportivo de La Coruña, agreeing a deal with the Galicians until summer 2020 and leaving his native Basque Country for the first time in his career. He suffered two relegations in only three years.

International career
Bóveda never earned any caps for Spain at any level. He did feature for the unofficial Basque Country regional team.

Career statistics

Club

Honours
Eibar
Segunda División: 2013–14

Athletic Bilbao
Supercopa de España: 2015

References

External links

1988 births
Living people
Spanish footballers
Footballers from Bilbao
Association football defenders
La Liga players
Segunda División players
Segunda División B players
Tercera División players
CD Basconia footballers
Bilbao Athletic footballers
Athletic Bilbao footballers
SD Eibar footballers
Deportivo de La Coruña players
Cypriot First Division players
Olympiakos Nicosia players
Basque Country international footballers
Spanish expatriate footballers
Expatriate footballers in Cyprus
Spanish expatriate sportspeople in Cyprus